"The Way That You Love" is a song by American singer and actress Vanessa Williams, released in January 1995 as the second single from her third album, The Sweetest Days (1995). Many different remixes are available for the song which was a Top 10 hit on the US Billboard Dance/Club Play Songs chart.

Critical reception
Michael Eric Dyson from Rolling Stone wrote that on "The Way That You Love", "Williams pays tribute to a lover's charms with a mellow groove".

Track listings and formats

European Maxi CD
 The Way That You Love (Mainstream Version) 3:54 	
 The Way That You Love (Rhythm Mix) 3:47 	
 The Way That You Love (20 Fingers Club Mix) 7:05 	
 The Way That You Love (E. Plugg Jeep Mix) 4:39 

US Maxi CD
 The Way That You Love (Rhythm Mix) 3:47 	
 The Way That You Love (E. Plugg Jeep Mix) 4:39 	
 The Way That You Love (Love Me Mix) 4:36 	
 The Way That You Love (20 Fingers Club Mix) 7:05 	
 The Way That You Love (Armand's Funky Foam Mix) 8:05 	
 The Way That You Love (Late Night Mix) 5:45 	

UK Maxi CD
 The Way That You Love Me (Mainstream Version) 3:54 	
 The Way That You Love Me (20 Fingers Club Mix) 7:05 	
 The Way That You Love Me (Armand's Funky Foam Mix) 8:05 	
 The Way That You Love Me (20 Fingers Dub) 5:28 	
 The Way That You Love Me (Rhythm Mix) 3:47 	
 The Way That You Love Me (Acappella) 3:21 	
 The Way That You Love Me (Late Night Mix) 5:45

Charts

Weekly charts

Year-end charts

References

1994 singles
Vanessa Williams songs
1994 songs
Hip hop soul songs